Number 1s, #1s or Number Ones may refer to:
A type of greatest hits album in which all or most of the songs were number-one chart hits. Among them are:
Number Ones (ABBA album), 2006
Number Ones (Bee Gees album), 2004
#1's (Destiny's Child album), 2005
Number Ones (Janet Jackson album), 2009
#1's (Mariah Carey album), 1998
#1's (video), the related DVD by Mariah Carey
Number Ones (Michael Jackson album), 2003
Number Ones (video), the related DVD by Michael Jackson
Reba #1's, an album by Reba McEntire
 Number 1's (Prince Royce album)
#1s... and Then Some, an album by Brooks & Dunn
Number Ones (TV series), a Canadian music-video program
The Number Ones, an album by the Beatles

See also
 :Category:Compilation albums of number-one songs 
 :Category:Number-one singles 
 Number One (disambiguation)
 One (disambiguation)
 Ones (disambiguation)